Calle Siete is a 2016 Philippine television drama comedy series broadcast by GMA Network. Directed by Monti Parungao, it stars Ryzza Mae Dizon, Eula Valdez and Christian Vasquez. It premiered on June 13, 2016 on the network's afternoon line up replacing Princess in the Palace. The series concluded on October 21, 2016 with a total of 94 episodes. It was replaced by Trops in its timeslot.

Premise
Sheila and Mark, a couple living in Dubai and working as a physical therapist and a spa attendant. The two decided to return to the Philippines because of their enough savings to build their dream house and dream business, a spa cum coffee shop. Sheila came home first because her contract expired while Mark, on the other hand, has a remaining month. Another reason was he is still training his job successor. Sheila surprised her Lola Nitz which she is celebrating her birthday in Mabuhay Compound where she grew up with the Mabuhay clan. However, she also found out that the bank would nearly confiscate her hometown so she spoke of her grandmother to pay it first.

Cast and characters

Lead cast
 Ryzza Mae Dizon as Barbie Delloso
 Eula Valdez as Shiela Mabuhay-Sebastian
 Christian Vasquez as Mark Sebastian

Supporting cast
 Kenneth Medrano as Jonas Delloso
 Patricia Tumulak as Patricia "Patring" Castro
 Gloria Sevilla as Elenita "Nitz" Mabuhay
 Rubi Rubi as Margarita "Margie" Silang
 Lucky Mercado as John Delloso
 Takako "Taki" Saito as Suzanne "Sushie" Silang
 Lovely Abella as Bonifacia "Bonnie" Suarez
 Leonora Cano as Mema
 Sinon Loresca as Manuel "Welwel" Geronimo
 Kervin Rivas as Kervin
 Bryan Benedict as Caleb
 Ian Angeles as Ian

Recurring cast
 Adrienne Vergara as Bianca
 Hailey Lim as Cristy
 Charles Jacob Briz as Ken
 Jester Hernandez as Toby

Guest cast
 Miguel Luna as Miguel
 Petite as Snowkie
 Maureen Larrazabal as Maria Magdalena 
 Regine Tolentino as Phoebe 
 Sandy Talag as Crystal
 Kylie Padilla as Sophie
 Archie Alemania as Timo
 Mosang as Mom Aw

Ratings
According to AGB Nielsen Philippines' Mega Manila household television ratings, the pilot episode of Calle Siete earned an 11.4% rating. While the final episode scored a 14.3% rating.

References

External links
 

2016 Philippine television series debuts
2016 Philippine television series endings
Filipino-language television shows
GMA Network drama series
Television series by TAPE Inc.
Television shows set in Manila